<noinclude>

Turkmendenizderyayollary Agency is a state agency in Turkmenistan that owns several state companies. It is under the jurisdiction of the Ministry of Industry and Communication of Turkmenistan. The main office is located in the city of Turkmenbashi. It is entrusted to manage state property, maintain transport security-related tasks and provide services in the field of maritime and inland waterway transport.

History 
Agency Turkmendenizderyayollary was established on August 5, 1992.

In April 2003, an Directorate of sea and river transport Turkmendenizderyayollary was established by merging the river and maritime departments of Turkmenistan.

On July 10, 2010, the Directorate of sea and river transport Turkmendenizderyayollary was transformed into the State Service of Maritime and River Transportation of Turkmenistan.

On January 29, 2019, the Ministry of Industry and Communication was established in Turkmenistan.  State Service of Maritime and River Transportation of Turkmenistan became part of the ministry as an agency  with name Turkmendenizderyayollary.

Overview 

The structure of the agency includes:

 Turkmenbashi International Seaport
 River secondary school in the city of Turkmenabat
 Turkmenbashi Marine Secondary Vocational School 
 Charlak Hotel 
 OJSC "Balkan" gämi gurluşyk we abatlaýyş zawody"
 CJSC "Deňiz söwda floty"
 OJSC Deryayollary

Until 2019 the structure of the agency embroidered as follows:
 Turkmen Riverways is a state-owned operator of river-ways and river-ports and operates   of river-ways on Amu Darya and Karakum Canal. Owns Turkmenabat River Port.
 Turkmen Seaways is a state-owned operator of sea-ways and seaports. It operates Turkmenbashi International Seaport.

International cooperation 
The agency cooperates with the International Maritime Organization, the European Maritime Safety Agency, the Russian Maritime Register of Shipping and Bureau Veritas.

See also 
 Transport in Turkmenistan
 Ministry of the Maritime Fleet (Soviet Union)
 Federal Agency for Maritime and River Transportation (Russia)

References

Links 
 Official web-site

Transport in Turkmenistan
Water transport in Turkmenistan